Elena Ionescu (17 May 1988) is a Romanian singer who was the lead singer of pop band Mandinga from 2006 until 2016, replacing Elena Gheorghe after she left the group to work on her solo career. Ionescu left the group in 2016 to pursue a solo career as well. Mandinga won the Romanian national selection for the Eurovision Song Contest 2012 in Baku, Azerbaijan, where Ionescu performed the hit song "Zaleilah". Ionescu was the second lead singer of Mandinga to represent Romania in the Eurovision Song Contest, as Elena Gheorghe represented Romania in the Eurovision Song Contest 2009.

Songs
2016: "Decembrie de poveste"
2017: "Elena Ionescu - Spune-i (feat. Mahia Beldo)" 
2017: "Laleyla"
2017: "Al 6-lea simt"
2018: "Ce e dragostea?"
2019: "Sube el volumen"

References 

1988 births
Living people
21st-century Romanian women singers
21st-century Romanian singers